Eleonora Trivella (born 30 January 1990) is an Italian lightweight rower bronze medal winner at senior level at the World Rowing Championships.

Achievements

References

External links
 
 Eleonora Trivella at Italian Rowing Federation

1990 births
Living people
Italian female rowers
World Rowing Championships medalists for Italy